Dzhodzhukh is a village in the Qabala Rayon of Azerbaijan.

References
 

Populated places in Qabala District